NTJ may stand for:
 National Theatre of Japan
 National Thowheeth Jama'ath